Cydia obliqua is a moth of the family Tortricidae. It was first described by Lord Walsingham in 1907. It is endemic to the island of Hawaii.

It is known only from three females and might possibly be just a form of Cydia plicatum.

External links

Species info

Grapholitini
Endemic moths of Hawaii